Paul Chabot (born March 19, 1974) is an American businessman, author, public speaker, former law enforcement officer, adjunct professor, and Commander of Naval Intelligence with the United States Navy Reserve. Chabot formerly served as a White House senior policy advisor on law enforcement for President George W. Bush, and prior was a Presidential Management Fellow. Paul also served in the U.S. State Department, Office of Inspector General, and U.S. Attorneys Office. He was the Republican candidate for California's 31st congressional district in 2014 and 2016. He was defeated by Democrat Pete Aguilar both times.
After losing the 2016 election, he moved with his family to McKinney, Texas, and in May 2017, launched Conservative Move, a company that conservative residents of California sell their homes and relocate to red states, starting with Collin County in Texas. He also launched Military Vet Move and Law Enforcement Move, helping veterans and police relocate.

Early life and education
Chabot was born in Loma Linda, California. He earned a Bachelor of Arts degree from California State University, San Bernardino, a Master of Public Administration from the University of Southern California, a Doctor of Education in executive leadership from the George Washington University, and  certificate in legislative studies from Georgetown University.

Career

Law Enforcement
In 1990, Chabot became a Sheriff Explorer Scout in high school and later, attended the San Bernardino Reserve Sheriff's Academy at night while attending California State University, San Bernardino in the daytime. In 1995, Chabot became a Reserve Deputy with the San Bernardino County Sheriff's Department and retired with 21-years of service in 2016. Chabot has also served as a police officer at the University of Southern California and was awarded the Meritorious Service Medal.

Military career
Chabot began his military career in 2001, serving first at the Office of Naval Intelligence later with the Defense Intelligence Agency, in conjunction with an assignment in The Pentagon working for the Joint Chiefs of Staff in the National Military Command Center. In 2008 Chabot served in Operation Iraqi Freedom with Special Operations Forces. He currently is a Commander with the U.S. Pacific Fleet of the United States Navy Reserve.

National Media Guest 
Chabot was a guest on national media outlets, including Fox News, Fox Business Network, Newsmax, Vice News and the Huffington Post. Chabot's YouTube channel hosts the recorded segments.

Business Owner and Realtor 
Paul is a licensed realtor and is the President and CEO of three real estate companies: Conservative Move, a nationwide real-estate firm operating in 40 states, Law Enforcement Move that operates in six states, and Military Vet Move which operates in 12 states. Chabot consulted on national security projects regarding drug cartels on the Mexican-American border with his company Chabot Strategies, LLC.

Educator 
Paul is an adjunct professor instructing doctoral-level students on public administration and has served on several dissertation defense committees. His work combating terrorism has been published within military journals and online military training sites. His dissertation work examined methods for dismantling high-level drug cartels.

California Parole Board
In 2006, Chabot was appointed by Governor Arnold Schwarzenegger, and confirmed by the California Senate, as commissioner to the California Parole Board. He served for three consecutive terms.

Elections and Politics
Chabot ran in the 2014 election for the U.S. House to represent California's 31st District. In the June 2014 primary, Chabot finished first with 26.7% of the vote, almost 10 points over his closest opponent, Democrat Pete Aguilar. Chabot lost to Aguilar in the November 2014 general election, 52% to 48%.

Chabot announced in February 2015 that he would run again for the U.S. House to represent California's 31st District in 2016. In the primary, he finished second, with 22.7%, to Aguilar's 43.1%; the other three candidates received 34.2% of the vote. Chabot again faced Aguilar in the 2016 general election, and was defeated with 43.9% of the vote.

He founded the Keep Texas Red Super PAC and McKinney Conservatives. In 2018, he was a delegate to the Texas GOP Convention. In 2020, he was appointed and then elected to the State GOP Convention Platform Committee.

In 2022, Chabot ran for the 61st District of Texas House of Representatives, representing parts of McKinney and Collin County. In the March 1 Republican primary, he advanced to the May 24 runoff, which he lost to Frederick Frazier.

External links
 Paul Chabot for Texas State Rep
 Chabot Strategies
 Conservative Move
 Paul Chabot, Former Drug Czar Advisor, Compares Marijuana To Child Pornography
 The Paul Chabot Story: Lose a House Race, Write a Book About It, Try Again

References

1974 births
Living people
United States Navy personnel of the Iraq War
American deputy sheriffs
American police officers
California Republicans
United States Navy officers
People from Rancho Cucamonga, California
George Washington University Graduate School of Education and Human Development alumni
California State University, San Bernardino alumni
USC Sol Price School of Public Policy alumni
People from Loma Linda, California
Candidates in the 2014 United States elections
Candidates in the 2022 United States elections
Texas Republicans
People from McKinney, Texas